Pandit Yashpaul (born 22 March 1937) is an Indian classical singer belonging to the Agra gharana (singing style).

Early life
Yashpaul was born in Gujranwala in 1937. After the partition his parents migrated to India and settled in Jalandhar, where he was initiated into music by Kasturilal ‘Jassra’, who was the disciple of Chhote Ghulam Ali Khan of Lahore. He received further training from Vilayat Hussain Khan and Yunus Hussain Khan from the Agra gharana. He was also inspired by Bade Ghulam Ali Khan and Mallikarjun Mansur.

Career
Yashpaul first performed when he was 11 years old at the "Harivallabh Sangeet Sammelan". He is the oldest alumni of Swami Harballabh Sangeet Akademi, Jalandhar. He has been performing on All India Radio since 1952. He has performed in many nationally-broadcast programmes of music, as well as annual Akashvani Sangeet Sammelans.

He is a composer and teacher. He has composed many bandishes under his pen name "Sagun Piya". He is a founder of Music Deptts at Panjab University and MCM DAV College of Women Chandigarh respectively. He retired as the Head of Department at the Department Music at Panjab University in 1997.

Awards and honors
Awards received by Yashpaul include:. 
 
National Sangeet Natak Academy Award
Award of National Scholarship, 1962 (Ministry of Education, Govt. of India)
Punjab State award
Punjab Sangeet Natak Academi award
Dedicated Educationist award
Sangeet Sumeru award
Sangeet Shiromani award
The Music Monarch of India’s north western region (the lifetime award by FFF)
Honored by Senior Citizens Association of Chandigarh
He is the founder and former Chairman of Deptts. of Music i.e., M.C.M. D.A.V. College for Women and Punjab University Chandigarh respectively

References

People from Gujranwala
Living people
1937 births
Indian male classical musicians
Agra gharana
20th-century Khyal singers
20th-century Indian male singers
20th-century Indian singers
Recipients of the Sangeet Natak Akademi Award